Reinhold Strassmann (or Straßmann) (24 January 1893 in Berlin – late October 1944 in Auschwitz concentration camp) was a German mathematician who proved Strassmann's theorem. His Ph.D. advisor at University of Marburg was Kurt Hensel.

Born into a Jewish family, Strassmann refused to leave Nazi Germany, and he was eventually detained and deported to Theresienstadt concentration camp in 1943. On October 23, 1944, he was deported from Theresienstadt to Auschwitz concentration camp, where he was murdered soon after.

He was the son of the forensic pathologist Fritz Strassmann.

Selected publications

References

 
DMV short biographies

1893 births
1944 deaths
20th-century German mathematicians
Number theorists
Scientists from Berlin
German civilians killed in World War II
University of Marburg alumni
Theresienstadt Ghetto prisoners
German people who died in Auschwitz concentration camp
German Jews who died in the Holocaust